The Democratic Left (Spanish: Izquierda Democrática, ID) is a social-democratic political party in Ecuador. It is a former member of the Socialist International. At the legislative elections, held on 20 October 2002, the party won at least 13 out of 100 seats. Its candidate Rodrigo Borja, who was president of Ecuador from 1988 to 1992, won 14.4% of the vote in the presidential elections of the same day.  For the October 2006 elections, it has entered into an alliance with the Ethics and Democracy Network (Red Etica y Democracia), to support the ticket formed by former Vice-President León Roldós, and Ramiro González, former Prefect of the Pichincha Canton. The party won 13 seats in Congress again, while its presidential ticket came in fourth place.

In April 2022 the party had thirteen members in the National Assembly after it excluded Johanna Moreira from the party.

References

External links
Official web site

1970 establishments in Ecuador
Democratic socialist parties in South America
Political parties established in 1970
Political parties in Ecuador
Social democratic parties in South America
Socialist parties in Ecuador